Valerie may refer to:

People
Saint Valerie (disambiguation), a number of saints went by the name Valerie
Valerie (given name), a feminine given name

Songs 
"Valerie" (Stevie Winwood song), a 1982 song by Steve Winwood from Talking Back to the Night
"Valerie" (Zutons song), a 2006 song by the Zutons from Tired of Hanging Around; covered by Mark Ronson, with lead vocals by Amy Winehouse
"Valerie", a 1981 song by Quarterflash, from Quarterflash
"Valerie", a 1982 song by Jerry Garcia from Run for the Roses
"Valerie", a 1986 song by Bad Company from Fame and Fortune
"Valerie", a 1986 song by Joy from Hello
"Valerie", a 1986 song by Richard Thompson
"Valerie", a 1993 song by Patti Scialfa from Rumble Doll
"Valerie", a 2002 song by Reel Big Fish from Cheer Up!
"Valerie", a 2011 song by the Weeknd from Thursday
"Valerie", a 2020 song by Bladee from 333
"La Valérie", a 2004 song by Malajube from Le compte complet

Other
Valerie (collective), a group of French musicians founded by David Grellier
Valerie (TV series), later known as The Hogan Family
Valerie (film), a 1957 feature film
Valérie (film), a 1969 Canadian film
Valerie, California
Valerie, a Gym Leader in the Pokémon X Version and Y Version games
Valerie Brown, a character in Josie and the Pussycats

See also
"Valleri", a 1968 song written by Boyce and Hart for the Monkees
Valery
 Valer (disambiguation)
 Valera (disambiguation)
 Valeria (disambiguation)
 Valérien (disambiguation)

 
 

cs:Valérie
hu:Valéria
pl:Waleria
sk:Valéria
sl:Valerija